Chrysoscota is a genus of moths in the family Erebidae. The genus was erected by George Hampson in 1900.

Species
 Chrysoscota albomaculata Rothschild, 1912
 Chrysoscota auranticeps Hampson, 1900
 Chrysoscota brunnea (Swinhoe, 1905)
 Chrysoscota conjuncta Rothschild, 1912
 Chrysoscota cotriangulata Holloway, 2001
 Chrysoscota flavostrigata Bethune-Baker, 1904
 Chrysoscota tanyphara Turner, 1940
 Chrysoscota vagivitta Walker, 1866

References

External links

Lithosiina
Moth genera